Garden City FC is a Belizean football team which currently competes in the FFB Top League. The team is based in Belmopan.

References

Football clubs in Belize